The Malagarasi sardine (Engraulicypris spinifer or Mesobola spinifer) is an East African species of freshwater fish in the family Cyprinidae. It is endemic to the Malagarasi River in Burundi and Tanzania. Its natural habitats are rivers, intermittent rivers, freshwater lakes, freshwater marshes, and inland deltas. It is threatened by habitat loss.

References

Malagarasi sardine
Freshwater fish of Tanzania
Malagarasi sardine
Taxa named by Hubert Matthes
Taxonomy articles created by Polbot
Taxobox binomials not recognized by IUCN